You and Others is the second album by British-based band, Vega4. It follows on five years after their debut album, Satellites. It was produced by former Compulsion guitarist Jacknife Lee, and released on October 30, 2006 on Sony BMG.

Track listing
"You & Me" – 3:26
"Traffic Jam" – 4:20
"Tearing Me Apart" – 4:57
"Life Is Beautiful" – 6:15
"You" – 4:14
"Let Go" – 3:49
"Bullets" – 5:08
"Papercuts" – 4:30
"If This Is It" – 3:38
"A Billion Tons of Light" - 4:48
"Boomerang" - 4:23

References

2006 albums
Albums produced by Jacknife Lee